Javier Núñez Molano (born 23 April 1983) is a Spanish butterfly and medley swimmer who competed in the 2008 Summer Olympics. He was born in Sabadell, Barcelona.

Notes

References

External links
 
 
 
 

1983 births
Living people
Spanish male butterfly swimmers
Spanish male medley swimmers
Olympic swimmers of Spain
Swimmers at the 2008 Summer Olympics
Mediterranean Games bronze medalists for Spain
Mediterranean Games medalists in swimming
Swimmers at the 2001 Mediterranean Games
21st-century Spanish people